Kellan Quick (born November 11, 1983) is a former professional gridiron football cornerback. He was signed by the Toronto Argonauts as an undrafted free agent in 2007. He played college football for Southern Oregon University.

Education
Quick played football at Skyview High School in Nampa, Idaho. He played for the Southern Oregon Raiders from 2002 to 2006. He majored in Business Communication.

Professional career
After going undrafted in the 2007 NFL draft, Quick was signed to the Toronto Argonauts on May 25, 2007, and was assigned to the practice squad on June 24, 2007. He spent the entire 2007 CFL season on the practice squad and was re-signed on January 23, 2008. He was released later before the 2008 season commenced.

External Links
 
 
 

1983 births
Living people
American football cornerbacks
American players of Canadian football
Toronto Argonauts players
Southern Oregon Raiders football players
People from Nampa, Idaho
Players of American football from Idaho